Kendall Jamaal Waston Manley (born 1 January 1988) is a Costa Rican professional footballer who plays as a centre-back for Liga FPD club Saprissa and the Costa Rica national team.

Club career

Saprissa and loans
Waston made his professional debut for Saprissa in 2006 and played on loan for Carmelita in the Primera División de Costa Rica before moving abroad for a six-month loan spell with Club Nacional de Football in the Primera División Uruguaya from February 2008. In March 2010, Waston signed a three-month loan deal with Bayamón of the Puerto Rico Soccer League to help the club qualify for the CONCACAF Champions League. He later had three more loan spells, one at UCR and two at Pérez Zeledón. In May 2012 Waston returned to Deportivo Saprissa to be part of the first team.

Vancouver Whitecaps FC
On 8 August 2014, Vancouver Whitecaps FC announced a deal that they had acquired the defender from Saprissa. Waston joined the first team in the midst of their 2014 MLS season.

On 25 October 2014, Waston scored the only goal in the Whitecaps' final game of the regular season, heading in a corner kick from Pedro Morales, sending the Whitecaps to the playoffs for the second time in their four years since joining MLS. The impact that Waston had on the Whitecaps' season after joining the club earned him a nomination for MLS Player of the Month for October. Waston played his 100th MLS game for the Whitecaps on 26 May 2018, against San Jose. He signed a new contract before the 2018 season, becoming a designated player under league rules. Waston was the captain of Vancouver Whitecaps, having been named so before the 2017 MLS season.

FC Cincinnati
On 11 December 2018, Waston was traded to FC Cincinnati ahead of their inaugural season in MLS. Vancouver received $450,000 of General Allocation Money, $300,000 of Targeted Allocation Money and an international roster spot. Waston captained the team for the majority of the 2019 MLS season. He was released by Cincinnati at the end of their 2020 season.

International career

A big defender, Waston was part of Costa Rica's 2007 FIFA U-20 World Cup squad.

Born in Costa Rica, Waston is of Jamaican descent. He made his senior debut for Costa Rica in a May 2013 match against Canada and earned, as of December 2014, one more cap in a 2014 FIFA World Cup qualification against Honduras. On 8 October, he scored a 95th-minute equaliser for Costa Rica against Honduras to send Costa Rica to the 2018 FIFA World Cup. While placed on the bench for the first two games of the FIFA world cup Kendall had a chance to play in the third match and was able to score off a header and gain his first World Cup goal.

Career statistics

International

International goals
Scores and results list Costa Rica's goal tally first.

Honours
Saprissa
Liga FPD: Clausura 2014, Clausura 2021
Costa Rican Cup : 2013

Vancouver Whitecaps FC
Canadian Championship: 2015

Individual
Vancouver Whitecaps FC Player of the Year: 2015, 2017
MLS Best XI: 2015, 2017
MLS All-Star: 2016
CONCACAF Best XI: 2017

References

External links

1988 births
Living people
A.D. Carmelita footballers
Association football defenders
Bayamón FC players
Club Nacional de Football players
Copa América Centenario players
Costa Rican footballers
Costa Rica international footballers
Costa Rican people of Jamaican descent
Designated Players (MLS)
Deportivo Saprissa players
FC Cincinnati players
Liga FPD players
Major League Soccer All-Stars
Major League Soccer players
Municipal Pérez Zeledón footballers
Footballers from San José, Costa Rica
C.F. Universidad de Costa Rica footballers
Uruguayan Primera División players
Vancouver Whitecaps FC players
Expatriate footballers in Puerto Rico
Expatriate footballers in Uruguay
Expatriate soccer players in Canada
Costa Rican expatriate sportspeople in Puerto Rico
Costa Rican expatriate sportspeople in Uruguay
Costa Rican expatriate sportspeople in Canada
2013 CONCACAF Gold Cup players
2015 CONCACAF Gold Cup players
2017 CONCACAF Gold Cup players
2018 FIFA World Cup players
2019 CONCACAF Gold Cup players
2021 CONCACAF Gold Cup players
2022 FIFA World Cup players
Costa Rica under-20 international footballers
Costa Rica youth international footballers